Carlos Moreno (29 August 1938 – 9 March 2014) was an Argentine actor and director. He primarily worked on movies and television shows. He was born in La Plata, Buenos Aires Province.

Moreno suffered a heart attack on 6 September 2013 and survived. On 9 March 2014, he suffered another heart attack, this time fatal, in Buenos Aires. He was 75 years old.

Career
Moreno trained under renowned film and theatre personalities like Carlos Gandolfo, Augusto Fernández, Agustín Alezzo and Hedy Crilla. He was a versatile actor, whose career included acting in TV shows, theatre, and films. He was most prolific on TV, acting in 30 shows, but the most important and favourite of all them is Cebollitas. Besides acting in plays, he also directed numerous plays. He acted in 15 films, mostly as a supporting actor. He made his silver screen debut in 1968 with the film The Project and went on to work in films like Knights of the Round Bed, The Power of Censorship, The Clinic of Dr. Curette, I'll Be Anything But I Love and The Hooky among others. Another Heart (2012) is the only film in which he played the lead role.

References

External links

1938 births
2014 deaths
Argentine male film actors
Argentine film directors
Argentine male stage actors
Argentine male television actors
Male actors from Buenos Aires
People from La Plata
Burials at La Chacarita Cemetery